Chrysoesthia longifibriata is a moth of the family Gelechiidae. It is found in the Russian Far East, where it has been recorded from the southern part of Primorsky Krai.

References

Moths described in 2010
Chrysoesthia